Bystřice pod Hostýnem is a town in Kroměříž District in the Zlín Region of the Czech Republic. It has about 8,000 inhabitants.

Administrative parts

Villages of Bílavsko, Hlinsko pod Hostýnem, Rychlov and Sovadina are administrative parts of Bystřice pod Hostýnem.

Geography
It lies in the Moravian-Silesian Foothills. The Bystřička stream flows through the town.

History
The first written mention of Bystřice is from 1368, when the settlement was acquired by Boček I of Poděbrady. A fortress was first mentioned here in 1440. From 1650 to 1827, the estate was owned by the Rottal family. The last owners were the Loudouns, the descendants of Ernst Gideon von Laudon, who held the castle until 1933.

In the mid-19th century, a spa was here. In 1861, German industrialists Michael Thonet and his son August established the largest factory for bentwood furniture in Europe here. Industrialization meant the greatest economic development of Bystřice pod Hostýnem and the influx of new inhabitants. In 1864, the municipality was promoted to a town. The railway was built in 1882.

Demographics

Economy
The bentwood furniture factory Thonet, founded in 1861, still operates and is the oldest factory of its kind in the world. It is one of the largest industrial employers in the region. In 1953, the company was renamed TON (Továrny na ohýbaný nábytek, i.e. "bentwood furniture factories").

Sights

The local Gothic fortress was rebuilt into a Renaissance castle probably in the mid-16th century. After it was damaged by fire, it was reconstructed in 1616. In the mid 18th century, two Neoclassical wings were added to the old castle. The last building modification was the extension of the so-called toilet tower in 1889. Today the Bystřice pod Hostýnem Castle is property of the town and is houses the town museum, cultural spaces, and part of the municipal office.

The Church of Saint Giles was built in 1744. The church was painted and frescoed by Jano Köhler, but only some of the original paintings have been preserved.

Notable people
František Sušil (1804–1868), priest and folk music collector; died here
Bohuslav Fuchs (1895–1972), modernist architect; worked here
Jaroslav Kozlík (1907–2012), educator, theorist of education and volleyball player
Šárka Jelínková (born 1968), politician

Twin towns – sister cities

Bystřice pod Hostýnem is twinned with:
 Salzkotten, Germany
 San Giovanni al Natisone, Italy

References

External links

Cities and towns in the Czech Republic
Populated places in Kroměříž District